Guillaume Laurent Dietsch (born 17 April 2001) is a French professional footballer who plays as a goalkeeper for Belgian First Division A club Seraing, on loan from FC Metz.

Career statistics

References

External links

2001 births
Living people
French footballers
France youth international footballers
French expatriate footballers
Association football goalkeepers
FC Metz players
R.F.C. Seraing (1922) players
Championnat National 3 players
Challenger Pro League players
Belgian Pro League players
French expatriate sportspeople in Belgium
Expatriate footballers in Belgium
People from Forbach
Footballers from Grand Est
Sportspeople from Moselle (department)